60 Leonis is a star in the zodiac constellation of Leo, located 127 light years from the Sun. It is visible to the naked eye as a faint, white-hued star with an apparent visual magnitude of 4.4. The star is moving closer to the Earth with a heliocentric radial velocity of −11 km/s.

This is an Am star with a stellar classification of A1 Vm, although LeBlanc et al. (2015) consider it an Ap star. The atmosphere displays clear indications of stratification of iron with no significant magnetic field detected. It is 195 million years old with a relatively low projected rotational velocity of 17 km/s. The star has 2.11 times the mass of the Sun and 1.80 times the Sun's radius. It is radiating 24.1 times the Sun's luminosity from its photosphere at an effective temperature of 9,540 K.

References

A-type main-sequence stars
Am stars
Leo (constellation)
Leo, b
Durchmusterung objects
Leonis, 60
095608
053954
4300
Suspected variables